is a Japanese actress and idol.

On November 14, 2013, she announced that she had married a non-celebrity. They registered their marriage on November 22. On September 14, 2015, she revealed that she gave birth to her first child, a girl, in America.

Filmography

Movies
 Pokémon: Lord of the 'Unknown' Tower (2000)
 Umizaru (2004)
 Limit of Love: Umizaru (2006)
 Umizaru 3: The Last Message (2010)
 Umizaru 4: Brave Hearts (2012)
 Another (2012)
 Team Batista Final ~ Kerberos no Shozo (2014)

TV dramas
Gift (1997) 
P.A. Private Actress (1998)
Sweet Devil (1998)
Seija no Kōshin  (1998) 
Abunai Hokago (1999) 
Best Friend (1999)
Naniwa Kinyudo 5 (2000)
Ikebukuro West Gate Park (2000)
Manatsu no Merry Christmas (2000)
Tengoku ni Ichiban Chikai Otoko 2 (2001)
Kizudarake no Love Song (2001)
My Little Chef (2002)
Yan Papa (2002)
Kimi ga Omoide ni Naru Mae ni (2004) 
Fuufu (2004)
Otouto (2004)
Umizaru Evolution (2005)
Hiroshima Showa 20 nen 8 Gatsu Muika (2005)
Haken no Hinkaku (2007)
Dream Again (2007)
Scrap Teacher (2008)
Kami no Shizuku (2009)
Majo Saiban (2009)
Keiji no Genba 2 (2009)
Hataraku Gon! (2009)
General Rouge no Gaisen (2010)
Unubore Deka (2010)
Face Maker (2010)
Brutus no Shinzo (2011)
Suna no Utsuwa 2011 (2011)Hikaru Hekiga (2011)Boku to Star no 99 Nichi (2011)Taira no Kiyomori (2012)Seinaru Kaibutsutachi (2012)Strawberry Night (2012)Mikeneko Holmes no Suiri (2012)Higashino Keigo Mysteries (2012)Cheap Flight (2013)Kyokuhoku Rhapsody (2013)Gochisousan (2013)Umi no Ue no Shinryojo (2013)Dr. DMAT (2014)Kizoku Tantei±'' (2017 – 2 episodes)

References

External links

 Agency profile 
 
 Ai Kato's JMDb Listing (in Japanese)

1982 births
Japanese actresses
Japanese idols
Living people
Actors from Aichi Prefecture
People from Kiyosu